Music is the third studio album by Mika Nakashima (fifth overall release). It sold only 231,521 copies in its first week but went to #1 on the Oricon 200 Album Chart. The album charted for 31 weeks and has since sold over 500,000 copies.

Track listing

Charts and sales

Oricon sales charts (Japan)

Singles

References

External links 
 http://www.mikanakashima.com
 http://www.oricon.co.jp/rank

2005 albums
Mika Nakashima albums